Hesse-Hanau was a territory in the Holy Roman Empire. It emerged when the former county of Hanau-Münzenberg became a secundogeniture of Hesse-Cassel in 1760. When the reigning count, William IX, also became landgrave of Hesse-Cassel in 1785, the two governments began to merge, although the process was delayed first by French occupation, and later by incorporation into the French satellite duchy of Frankfurt. The incorporation of Hesse-Hanau with Hesse-Cassel was not completed until 1821.

Secundogeniture

When the hereditary prince of Hesse-Cassel, the later Frederick II, converted to Roman Catholicism, his father, the reigning landgrave William VIII decided to do what he could to limit his son's future realm. He therefore made the county of Hanau-Münzenberg, incorporated with Hesse-Cassel in 1736, a secundogeniture of Hesse-Cassel, transferring it to the oldest son of Frederic, the hereditary count William.

Sovereignty

As count William was underage, his mother the landgravine, princess Mary of Great Britain, ruled as his legal guardian. After his access to the throne of Hesse-Cassel in 1760, landgrave Frederick II repeatedly tried to reunite Hesse-Hanau with Hesse-Cassel, but his efforts failed due to the resistance of Great Britain and the Protestant estates. As further protection, troops from Hanover were garrisoned in Hanau. When William came of age in 1764 he took over the government of the county. At the death of Frederick II in 1785, William became landgrave of Hesse-Cassel. The government of Hesse-Hanau remained in general separate from Hesse-Cassel. Cabinet and war office were, however, merged with those in Hesse-Cassel, and the court of appeal of Cassel got jurisdiction over Hanau in 1792. Until then Hesse-Hanau was ruled as an independent state, undergoing extensive modernizations with the erection of significant buildings in the capital of Hanau. Means for this came from the subsidies the reigning count received from his uncle, king George III of Great Britain. In return, Hesse-Hanau made available a contingent of 2,400 soldiers for the use of the British Crown in the American Revolutionary War.

Hesse-Hanau Contingent

The Hesse-Hanau contingent in the American Revolutionary War, contained the following units: 
 Hessen-Hanauisches Regiment Erbprinz 1776
 Hessen-Hanauisches Jägerkorps Creutzburg 1777
 Hessen-Hanauische Artillerie-Kompanie Pausch 1777
 Hessen-Hanauisches Freikorps Janecke 1781

Napoleonic Wars
Hesse-Cassel became an electorate in 1803, while Hesse-Hanau became the principality of Hanau. However, in 1806 the Holy Roman Empire was dissolved and Hesse-Cassel was incorporated into the French satellite Kingdom of Westphalia. Hanau came under French military occupation, then in 1810 was incorporated into the Grand Duchy of Frankfurt, another French satellite. It was not until after the German War of Liberation in 1813 that the sovereignty of Hesse-Cassel was restored.

References

Citations

Cited literature
 Arnd, Carl (1858). Geschichte der Provinz Hanau und der unteren Maingegend. Hanau.
 Kügler, Detmar (1980). Die deutschen Truppen in amerikanischen Unabhängigleitskrieg. Stuttgart.
Nöding, Caspar (1836). Statistik, Topographie und Geschichte des Landgräflichen und Kurfürstlichen Hauses Hessen-Kassel. Kassel.
Dietrich, Reinhard (1993). " … wegen geführten großen Staats, aber schlechter Zahlung der Schulden …. Zur finanziellen Lage der Grafschaft Hanau im 17. Jahrhundert." Hanauer Geschichtsblätter, 31.

Hesse-Hanau
Hesse-Hanau
Early Modern history of Germany
1760 establishments in the Holy Roman Empire